Mixx FM 88.9 is a commercial radio station broadcasting from Hamilton, Victoria, Australia. It is currently owned by Ace Radio & broadcasts A Contemporary Hits Radio (CHR) format. It features both locally produced content & nationally syndicated content from both NOVA Entertainment & Grant Broadcasters. In 2003 a repeater was established in Portland.

References

Radio stations in Victoria
Contemporary hit radio stations in Australia